Mount Broderick is a summit in Yosemite National Park, United States.

Mount Broderick was named for David C. Broderick, a United States Senator from California.

There are rock climbing routes on Mount Broderick.

References

External links

 Peakbagger on Mount Broderick

Mountains of Mariposa County, California
Mountains of Northern California